The De Wandre was a Belgian automobile manufactured around 1923.  Called "the elegant spider", it was a wire-wheeled sports car using the chassis and running gear of the Model T Ford.

See also
Delecroix, first build in 1897, and commercialised in 1898

References
David Burgess Wise, The New Illustrated Encyclopedia of the Automobile

Defunct motor vehicle manufacturers of Belgium
Motor vehicle manufacturers of Belgium